Anadia is a genus of lizards in the family Gymnophthalmidae. The genus is endemic to southern Central America and northern South America.

Species
The following species are recognized as being valid.
Anadia altaserrania 
Anadia antioquensis 
Anadia bitaeniata  – two-banded anadia
Anadia blakei  – Blake's anadia 
Anadia bogotensis  – Bogota anadia
Anadia brevifrontalis  – shorthead anadia
Anadia buenaventura 
Anadia bumanguesa 
Anadia escalerae 
Anadia hobarti  – Hobart's anadia
Anadia hollandi 
Anadia marmorata  – spotted anadia
Anadia ocellata  – ocellated anadia
Anadia pamplonensis  – Pamplona anadia
Anadia pariaensis 
Anadia petersi  – Peters' anadia
Anadia pulchella  – Ruthven's anadia
Anadia rhombifera  – rhombifer anadia
Anadia steyeri  – Steyer's anadia
Anadia vittata  – Boulenger's anadia

Nota bene: A binomial authority in parentheses indicates that the species was originally described in a genus other than Anadia.

References

Further reading
Boulenger GA (1885). Catalogue of the Lizards in the British Museum (Natural History). Second Edition. Volume II. Iguanidæ, Xenosauridæ, Zonuridæ, Anguidæ, Anniellidæ, Heldermatidæ, Varanidæ, Xantusiidæ, Teiidæ, Amphisbænidæ. London: Trustees of the British Museum (Natural History). (Taylor and Francis, printers). xiii + 497 pp. + Plates I-XXIV. (Genus Anadia, p. 398).
Gray JE (1845). Catalogue of the Specimens of Lizards in the Collection of the British Museum. London: Trustees of the British Museum. (Edward Newman, printer). xxviii + 289 pp. (Anadia, new genus, p. 58).

 
Lizard genera
Lizards of South America
Taxa named by John Edward Gray